Coffeyville is a city in southeastern Montgomery County, Kansas, United States, located along the Verdigris River in the state's southeastern region.  As of the 2020 census, the population of the city was 8,826.  Coffeyville is the most populous city of Montgomery County, and the home to Coffeyville Community College.  The town of South Coffeyville, Oklahoma is approximately 1 mile south of the city.

History

This settlement was founded in 1869 as an Indian trading post by Col. James A. Coffey, serving the population across the border in what was then the Indian Territory. The town was stimulated in 1871 by being made a stop on the Leavenworth, Lawrence & Galveston Railroad, which connected it to other markets and developments.  With the arrival of the railroad, a young surveyor, Napoleon B. Blanton, was dispatched to lay out the town.  The naming of the town was left to the toss of a coin between Col. Coffey and U.S. Army Captain Blanton.  Coffey won the toss and the town was officially named Coffeyville.

The city was incorporated in 1872, but the charter was voided as illegal, and the city was re-incorporated in March 1873.

As a frontier settlement, Coffeyville had its share of violence. On October 5, 1892, four of the Dalton Gang were killed in a shootout during an attempted bank robbery; Emmett Dalton survived with 23 gunshot wounds and later pleaded guilty to second-degree murder, although he later asserted that he never fired a shot during the robbery. He served 14 years before being pardoned. The gang had been trying to rob the First National and Condon banks, located across the street from each other. Law enforcement personnel and civilians recognized them under their disguises of fake beards and attacked the gang members as they fled one of the banks. Three civilians and a local marshal, Charles T. Connelly, died defending the town. The town holds an annual celebration each October to commemorate the Dalton Raid.

After the discovery of its resources of plentiful natural gas and abundant clay, Coffeyville enjoyed rapid growth from 1890 to 1910, as its population expanded sixfold. Many of the Coffeyville buildings now appearing in the National Register of Historic Places (NRHP) were built during this time period. They include the Old Condon National Bank (now the Perkins Building, c. 1890, added 1/12/1973), the Brown Mansion (c. 1904-1907, added 12/12/1976), the new larger Bethel African Methodist Episcopal Church (c. 1907, added 7/28/1995) and the Charles M. Ball House (c. 1906-1908, added 2/7/2011).

From the turn of the 20th century to the 1930s, Coffeyville was one of the largest glass and brick manufacturing centers in the nation. During this same period, the development of oil production attracted the founding of several oil field equipment manufacturers, and more workers and residents.

In March 1927, a racially charged riot occurred after three African American men were arrested on a false accusation of raping two teenage girls. A white mob stormed the jail, but were unable to locate the three men. The mob then attacked African Americans on the streets. Kansas National Guardsmen arrived and restored order.

Early Sunday School
In 1930 residents who were members of the Church of Jesus Christ of Latter-day Saints (LDS) organized a Sunday School; it was one of only 11 places in Kansas to have such a facility then.

Coffeyville Multiscope
Coffeyville industrialist Douglas Brown founded Coffeyville Multiscope, which produced components of the Norden bombsight. This played a determining role in the perfection of precision daylight bombing during World War II as a result of the bombsight's advanced accuracy and drift correction capability.

2007 flood
On July 1, 2007, Coffeyville suffered a major flood when the Verdigris River crested at 10 feet above flood stage and flooded approximately a third of the city. The flood topped the local refinery (Coffeyville Resources LLC) levees by 4 feet, allowing oil to pollute the water. Approximately 1700 barrels (71,000 gallons) of crude oil mingled with the already contaminated flood waters. The EPA worked to prevent the oil and flood water mix from continuing downriver, where it could damage the water in Oologah Lake near Oologah, Oklahoma. Many residential water supplies are drawn from that lake. A minimal amount of oil reached Oologah Lake, and it did not pose a threat to the water supplies of other cities along the Verdigris River or from the lake. A number of animals were found dead or injured in flood areas, covered with oil.

By July 2, areas east of Patterson Street were off limits, and a curfew was enacted in other areas of the city. On July 3, the city lost its supply of potable water, but the water service was restored and the order to boil water rescinded on July 7. The Federal Emergency Management Agency (FEMA) and the Red Cross came to aid residents, and Kansas Governor Kathleen Sebelius and President George W. Bush declared the city a federal disaster area. Most displaced residents found shelter with family and friends, but many were sheltered in two area churches and a senior citizens' apartment complex. Some pets were rescued to a temporary animal shelter built for them at LeClere Park.

The flooded area on the city's east side was reopened on July 11 for residents and business owners to begin assessing damage and to retrieve salvageable items.
 In order to focus on the post-flood recovery and clean-up, the city and state cancelled the 2007 Inter-State Fair & Rodeo. The ongoing flood recovery included a wholesale environmental remediation of the flood-affected eastern portion of the city, which continued through late 2008 to early 2009. Many of the flood-damaged homes were purchased by Coffeyville Resources LLC as a part of its effort to compensate the homeowners affected by the oil spill.

Geography
The city is situated about one-half mile north of the Oklahoma state line at  (37.037708, -95.626438), along the west bank of the Verdigris River. Coffeyville Municipal Airport is a few miles northeast of the city along US-169.

Coffeyville, specifically a spot just north of Coffeyville Country Club, is the default center starting point of Google Maps, being the accidental center point of the default starting map being displayed, which shows the 48 contiguous United States. (Lawrence, Kansas also claims to be the Google center as it has been the default mid point of the interactive 3D map Google Earth). Other locations that are considered to be the geographic center of the contiguous United States are also in Kansas.

Climate

According to the Köppen Climate Classification system, Coffeyville has a humid subtropical climate, abbreviated "Cfa" on climate maps.

Demographics

Coffeyville has experienced a slow and steady population decline since around 1960, when its population peaked at more than 17,000.  Changes in industry and oil production have caused a loss of jobs in the area, and residents have moved to find work. As of 2006 the population was estimated to be  in the year , .

2010 census
As of the census of 2010, there were 10,295 people, 4,226 households, and 2,456 families residing in the city. The racial makeup of the city was 72.3% White, 11.7% African American, 5.0% Native American, 0.7% Asian, 0.2% Pacific Islander, 3.3% from other races, and 6.8% from two or more races. Hispanic or Latino of any race were 7.4% of the population.

There were 4,226 households, of which 28.2% had children under the age of 18 living with them, 39.9% were married couples living together, 13.5% had a female householder with no husband present, 4.8% had a male householder with no wife present, and 41.9% were non-families. 35.7% of all households were made up of individuals, and 16.1% had someone living alone who was 65 years of age or older. The average household size was 2.29 and the average family size was 2.98.

The median age in the city was 37.1 years. 22.6% of residents were under the age of 18; 13.3% were between the ages of 18 and 24; 22.4% were from 25 to 44; 23.6% were from 45 to 64; and 18.1% were 65 years of age or older. The gender makeup of the city was 47.5% male and 52.5% female.

2000 census
As of the U.S. Census in 2000, there were 11,021 people, 4,691 households, and 2,847 families residing in the city. The racial makeup of the city was 75.76% White, 12.12% Black or African American, 4.97% Native American, 0.60% Asian, 0.04% Pacific Islander, 1.63% from other races, and 4.87% from two or more races. Hispanic or Latino of any race were 3.82% of the population.

There were 4,691 households, out of which 26.8% had children under the age of 18 living with them, 45.0% were married couples living together, 11.9% had a female householder with no husband present, and 39.3% were non-families. 35.4% of all households were made up of individuals, and 18.6% had someone living alone who was 65 years of age or older. The average household size was 2.25 and the average family size was 2.90.

In the city the population was spread out, with 24.0% under the age of 18, 10.0% from 18 to 24, 23.3% from 25 to 44, 21.3% from 45 to 64, and 21.4% who were 65 years of age or older. The median age was 39 years. For every 100 females, there were 87.2 males. For every 100 females age 18 and over, there were 82.1 males.

The median income for a household in the city was $25,542, and the median income for a family was $33,180. Males had a median income of $29,199 versus $17,940 for females. The per capita income for the city was $15,182. About 10.9% of families and 15.0% of the population were below the poverty line, including 18.6% of those under age 18 and 10.9% of those age 65 or over.

Economy
Coffeyville has a long history as a center of industry and manufacturing.
Coffeyville Resources operates a 100,000 barrels per day refinery and a large nitrogen fertilizer plant, using a unique Texaco process of ammonia extraction from coke byproducts produced in the refinery. Sherwin-Williams Chemical Co. has operated a smelting facility in the community since 1909. 
 
Coffeyville is also home to John Deere Corporation's Coffeyville Works, which is a major manufacturer of off-road equipment automatic transmissions for the construction, agriculture and mining industries. Acme Foundry is a foundry that has been in operation since 1905 and employs more than 300 people.

Taylor Crane & Rigging is a regional hauling operation, full-service industrial mover and craning services company. Taylor also maintains a facility in Tulsa, Oklahoma Other nearby in-county employers include Cessna Aircraft Division of Textron and Spears Manufacturing, a large producer of extruded PVC pipe products.

Historic
Southwire Corp is a maker of stranded and solid core wire and acquired the Leviton Industries facility of American Insulated Wire in 2010.  The plant was closed in 2014.

Coffeyville was home to an Amazon.com warehouse from 1999 to 2015.  It was closed because Amazon was shifting to warehouses closer to large cities.  The facility was previously operated by Golden Books.

Education

Public
The community is served by Coffeyville USD 445 public school district, which educates around 2,000 students in three facilities.  The district has one early learning center, one large consolidated elementary school with four pods and an Age-to-Age kindergarten, one middle school and one high school.
 Field Kindley High School, grades 9–12, named after Field Kindley.
 Roosevelt Middle School, grades 7–8.
 Community Elementary School, grades K–6.  Age-to-Age Kindergarten
 Dr. Jerry Hamm Early Learning Center, grades preschool.

Private
 Holy Name School, grades PK-6, parochial private school operated by the Roman Catholic Diocese of Wichita.

College
Advanced education is provided by Coffeyville Community College at three campuses.  The main campus and technical trades campus are each in Coffeyville, while a third campus is in Columbus, Kansas.  Four-year college degrees are offered by Oklahoma Wesleyan University, Friends University and Sterling College at the main Coffeyville Community College campus.  Coffeyville Community College has a long history of academic and athletic success.

Transportation
Bus service is provided northward towards Kansas City, Missouri and southward towards Tulsa, Oklahoma by Jefferson Lines (subcontractor of Greyhound Lines). Coffeyville and surrounding communities are also served by Connections Transportation which has its headquarters in nearby Independence, Kansas. Coffeyville has two railroads that serve the community, the Union Pacific Railroad and a short line railroad, South Kansas and Oklahoma Railroad which is owned by Watco. Coffeyville is served by two U.S. highways, US 166 which runs east-west from where the highway enters from the east at the Verdigris River bridge on Northeast Street to Eleventh Street, and exits to the west at the Union Pacific Railroad viaduct on Eighth Street. US 169 which is a north-south highway, enters from the east at the Verdigris River bridge on Northeast Street to Eleventh Street, then turns left just past the Kansas and Oklahoma Railroad overpass onto Walnut Street and continues south on Walnut Street] and exits the city and continues south towards Tulsa, Oklahoma.

Coffeyville Municipal Airport (KCFV; FAA ID: CFV), about four miles northeast, has two runways, the longest 5868’ x 100’.  Commercial air transportation is available out of Tulsa International Airport, about 66 miles south.

Media
The Coffeyville Journal is the local newspaper, published twice a week.

One AM and three FM radio stations are licensed to and/or broadcast from Coffeyville. KGGF (AM) broadcasts on 690 AM, playing a News/Talk format. KUSN, a Country station, is licensed to Dearing, Kansas, but broadcasts from Coffeyville on 98.1 FM. KGGF-FM, licensed to Fredonia, Kansas, broadcasts an Oldies format from Coffeyville on 104.1 FM. KQQF is licensed to Coffeyville and broadcasts on 98.9 FM.

Coffeyville is in the Tulsa, Oklahoma television market.

In popular culture
Coffeyville is mentioned in the song "Doolin–Dalton" by The Eagles from their 1973 album, Desperado.
In the 2002 movie, Reign of Fire character Denton Van Zan (Matthew McConaughey) refers to Coffeyville when describing his moment of realizing how to kill dragons in the movie.
Coffeyville is a featured location in the 2009 video game Call of Juarez : Bound in Blood, and its successor Call of Juarez: Gunslinger.
Coffeyville is featured in John Lee Hancock's 2019 film The Highwaymen.
Coffeyville is mentioned in the pilot episode of Epix's series "Billy The Kid" (2022) as the destination for his family when leaving New York City.

Notable people

Notable individuals who were born in and/or have lived in Coffeyville include:

 Mildred "Micky" Axton, aviator and educator
 Terry Beeson, NFL linebacker, Seattle Seahawks
 Bob Bettisworth, member of Alaska House of Representatives
 Mildred Burke, member of the Professional Wrestling Hall of Fame
 Phil Ehart, drummer of the rock band Kansas
 Wade Flemons, former member of the music group Earth, Wind & Fire
 Mondriel Fulcher, NFL player
 Denver David Hargis, Kansas politician
 Kenyon Hopkins, musician and composer
 Walter Johnson, Hall of Fame baseball player
 Ron Kenoly, popular worship leader
 Field Eugene Kindley, aviator and World War I ace
 Jack "Dusty" Kleiss, World War II naval aviator, Navy Cross recipient, credited with sinking two Japanese aircraft carriers on June 4, 1942.
 Omar Knedlik, inventor of the ICEE frozen drink
 Rudy May, former Major League  baseball pitcher
 Harold Clement McGugin, U.S. Congressman, 1931–1935
 William Mueller, professional wrestler known as "Trevor Murdoch" and "Jethro Holiday"
 Gary Paxton, record producer, recording artist, songwriter
 W. Ann Reynolds, zoologist, administrator at four universities
 Lafayette "Reb" Russell, football player and western movie actor 
 Johnny Rutherford, race car driver, 3-time Indy 500 winner
 Henry Schichtle, football player
 Cynthia Sikes, actress
 Frank Wickware, Negro leagues and Pre-Negro leagues baseball pitcher
 Wendell Willkie, 1940 Republican presidential candidate

See also
 List of oil pipelines
 List of oil refineries

References

Further reading

External links

 City of Coffeyville
 Coffeyville - Directory of Public Officials
 Coffeyville, Kansas: The Town That Stopped the Dalton Gang, a National Park Service Teaching with Historic Places (TwHP) lesson plan
   Kristine Crispel's horse farm outside Coffeyville has the distinction of being the center of the world—according to Google.
 Coffeyville city map, KDOT

Cities in Kansas
Cities in Montgomery County, Kansas
Populated places established in 1869
1869 establishments in Kansas